Maria Grace Saffery (1773–1858) was a Baptist poet and hymn-writer from England.

Early life

Maria Grace Andrews was born in 1773 in the Westbury district of Wiltshire, England. Saffery was possibly the daughter of William Andrews of Stroud Green, Newbury, Berkshire although other sources differ. She was baptized on 30 November 1774. At the age of fifteen, she started writing her first big piece and showed great abilities in doing so. Her first poem was about Chait Singh, the Raja of Benares who was in dispute with Warren Hastings in India. Saffery was originally brought under the personal influence of Thomas Scott, the bible commentator.

Personal and family life
Maria had a sister named Anne, who was also a writer. Maria married John Saffery, pastor of the Baptist church at Brown Street in Salisbury, becoming his second wife, in 1799. They had six children; the eldest, Philip John Saffery, succeeded to the office of pastor of the church at his father's death in 1825. Saffery also created a girls' school in Salisbury. In 1835 she retired to Bratton, also in Wiltshire, where the rest of her life was spent with her daughter. She died on 5 March 1858 and was buried in the graveyard of the baptist chapel there.

Major works

Poems
 Cheyt Sing. A Poem. By a Young Lady of Fifteen (1790)

Hymns
 Tis the Great Father we adore (1828) 
 Poems on Sacred Subjects (1834) 
 God of the sunlight hours, how sad (1834)
 There is a little lonely fold (1834)
 Fain, O my child, I'd have thee know (1844)

Novels
 The Noble Enthusiast (1792)

See also
English women hymnwriters (18th to 19th-century)

 Eliza Sibbald Alderson
 Augusta Amherst Austen
 Sarah Bache
 Charlotte Alington Barnard
 Sarah Doudney
 Charlotte Elliott
 Ada R. Habershon
 Katherine Hankey
 Frances Ridley Havergal
 Anne Steele
 Emily Taylor
 Emily H. Woodmansee

References

Further reading
 

1773 births
1858 deaths
18th-century English writers
English women writers
English women poets
English hymnwriters
British women hymnwriters
18th-century English women writers
18th-century English women
18th-century English people